Jeff W. Hickman (born November 28, 1973) is an American politician in the U.S. state of Oklahoma. He is a former Speaker of the Oklahoma House of Representatives, as of February 3, 2017.

Hickman entered office in 2004 as a member of the Oklahoma House of Representatives, representing a Northwest Oklahoma district. He served as Speaker Pro Tempore from 2011 to 2012. He lost a previous bid to become Speaker of the Oklahoma House of Representatives to T.W. Shannon.

Early life and family
Jeff Hickman was born in Alva, Oklahoma on November 28, 1973, to Steve and Cathy (Leamon) Hickman. He was raised in and around Cherokee and Dacoma.

A graduate of the University of Oklahoma, Hickman worked as the press secretary of the president of the University of Oklahoma.

Political career

Hickman began his political career when he was first elected to the Oklahoma House of Representatives on November 2, 2004. He became Speaker Pro Tempore of the Oklahoma House of Representatives on January 4, 2011.

Because Speaker Kris Steele was term limited, Republican members of the Oklahoma House of Representatives had to elect new leadership. Hickman ran for Speaker of the Oklahoma House of Representatives, but was not selected to serve.

As a regular member of the Oklahoma House of Representatives in 2013, Hickman is the author of major education reform legislation.

Hickman is term limited in the Oklahoma Legislature in 2016. Hickman was named a 2014 Aspen Institute Rodel Fellow.

District
House District 58 represents Alfalfa, Grant, Major, Woods, and Woodward counties.

Election history

References

1973 births
Living people
Republican Party members of the Oklahoma House of Representatives
People from Alfalfa County, Oklahoma
People from Alva, Oklahoma
People from Woods County, Oklahoma
21st-century American politicians
Speakers of the Oklahoma House of Representatives